The Third Avenue–138th Street station is an express station on the IRT Pelham Line of the New York City Subway located at the intersection of Third Avenue and East 138th Street in the Bronx. It is served by the 6 train at all times and the <6> train during weekdays in the peak direction.

History 
The Third Avenue–138th Street station was opened on August 1, 1918, and was the first station of the IRT Pelham Line to open. Service was provided by Lexington Avenue Line local service. The construction of the Pelham Line was part of the Dual Contracts, signed on March 19, 1913 and also known as the Dual Subway System. The Pelham Line was proposed to be a branch of the Lexington Avenue Line running northeast via 138th Street, Southern Boulevard and Westchester Avenue to Pelham Bay Park. This was the terminal of the line until January 7, 1919, when the Pelham Line was extended to Hunts Point Avenue.

Under the 2015–2019 MTA Capital Plan, the station, along with thirty other New York City Subway stations, will undergo a complete overhaul and would be entirely closed for up to 6 months. Updates would include cellular service, Wi-Fi, charging stations, improved signage, and improved station lighting. However, these renovations are being deferred until the 2020–2024 Capital Program due to a lack of funding. In 2019, the MTA announced that this station would become ADA-accessible as part of the agency's 2020–2024 Capital Program.

Station layout 

The station has two island platforms and three tracks, with the center track used for weekday peak direction express service. During weekday morning rush hour, two southbound 6 trains originate here.

The mosaic trim on the station's track walls are predominantly tan and buff, with the numeral "3" shown in slightly cruciform-shaped friezes with a slate blue background appearing at regular intervals. Clusters of small blue diamonds set in dark blue sit on either side of these plaques. A crossover exists via the mezzanine, and a closed crossunder is located at the center of the platforms. A high ceiling is found in the station and the northbound platform has an old tower at the south end.

To the south, the line goes under the Harlem River into Manhattan and merges with the IRT Jerome Avenue Line to form the IRT Lexington Avenue Line. Just before the slight jog going towards Manhattan, a provision was provided in anticipation of its connection with the then newly planned Second Avenue Subway, which was originally planned to take over the service south of this point, and relieve congestion on the IRT Lexington Avenue Subway.

A paid transfer was available to the IRT Third Avenue Line at the 138th Street station. This is the southernmost station in the Bronx on the IRT Pelham Line.

Exits

References

External links 

 
 Station Reporter – 6 train
 The Subway Nut – 3rd Avenue–138th Street Pictures
 Third Avenue entrance from Google Maps Street View
 Alexander Avenue entrance from Google Maps Street View
 Platforms from Google Maps Street View

IRT Pelham Line stations
New York City Subway stations in the Bronx
Railway stations in the United States opened in 1918
Third Avenue